The Goodsprings Cemetery consists of  and is an old, continuing cemetery located southwest of Las Vegas, Nevada seven miles (11 km) from Jean and just before entering the town of Goodsprings.

History 
The cemetery was in use long before A.J. Robbins donated the property to the town in 1913 with the earliest marked burial dating to December 27, 1890 for that of Anna Nimmer.

The cemetery has been investigated by the Las Vegas Society of Supernatural Investigations for signs of those who have left this mortal realm. Bigfoot's Pad Paranormal Team has investigated this location and others for signs of the paranormal since 2008.

Interments 
George Fayle, former Clark County Commission chairman, who built the Fayle Goodsprings Hotel in 1916, and Jean Fayle, for whom the town of Jean was named, are buried there along with many war veterans. Norman Price, who built the Goodsprings School, is also buried in this cemetery.

References

External links 
 goodsprings.org: Goodsprings, Nevada Cemetery
 
 Tombstone Project: Rural Clark County
 GS Cemetery Nov 2000

History of Nevada
History of the Mojave Desert region
Buildings and structures in Clark County, Nevada
Cemeteries in Nevada